Pointe de Charbonnel is a mountain of Savoie, France. It lies in the Graian Alps range. It has an elevation of 3,752 metres above sea level.

References

Alpine three-thousanders
Mountains of Savoie
Mountains of the Alps